Glenwood, Washington may refer to the following places in the U.S. state of Washington:
Glenwood, Kitsap County, Washington, an unincorporated community in Kitsap County
Glenwood, Klickitat County, Washington, an unincorporated community in Klickitat County
Glenwood, Whitman County, Washington, an unincorporated community in Whitman County